The Secret of the Selenites is a 1984 French animated comedy film directed by Jean Image, his last film before he died 5 years later. It is also known as Moon Madness in the United States and Moontrek in the United Kingdom.

The film is loosely based on the novel Baron Munchausen's Narrative of his Marvellous Travels and Campaigns in Russia (1785) by Rudolf Erich Raspe. Baron Munchausen, the titular protagonist, is a fictional German nobleman. Raspe based the character on a real-life Freiherr (Baron), Hieronymus Karl Friedrich, Freiherr von Münchhausen (1720–1797). The fictional Baron of the novel is a retired soldier and world traveler, who narrates tall tales about his past. In one of his best-known stories, the Baron travels to the Moon.

Plot
In the year 1787, the astrologer Sirius seeks proof of the existence of the Selenites, a fabled race of Moon dwellers said to possess the talisman of eternal life. He offers his entire fortune to his cousin, the Baron Munchausen, if the Baron journeys to the Moon and retrieves the talisman. Accompanying the Baron on this adventure are his friends Nimrod, who can see great distances; Earfull, whose huge ears grant him superhuman hearing; Hurricane, who can exhale great gusts of wind; the fleet-footed Cavallo; and Hercules, who is as strong as his namesake. They board a tall-masted ship, the Clair de Lune, and deliberately sail into a fierce storm. By inflating a trio of hot air balloons and riding a waterspout high into the air, the ship takes flight and leaves Earth.

Arriving at the Moon, the Clair de Lune descends into a lunar crater where it becomes wedged. The adventurers fall into an underground lake and are attacked by swimming monsters, but are rescued by flying creatures and soon meet the Selenites, who are humanoid but have three legs and crescent-shaped heads that are detached from their bodies. They are given a tour of the Selenite kingdom, which includes many fantastic sights and creatures. The Selenite king informs the Earthlings that their coming was foretold, and that they are prophesied to free the Selenites from their enemies, the small, accordion-headed Green Means, who seek to steal the talisman of life. The Earthlings take part in friendly competitions against the Selenites: Nimrod defeats their jousting champion, Cavallo—with assistance from Hurricane—beats their fastest runner in a race, and Hercules defeats their wrestling champion.

The Green Means launch an attack from their nearby spacecraft, sending their flying saucers to invade the Selenite kingdom. Armed with rayguns, they overwhelm the Selenite defenders. The Earthlings join the battle, driving back the Green Means, stopping their leader from stealing the talisman, and rescuing the Selenite king and queen. As reward for their heroics, the king presents each of them with a talisman of eternal life, making them immortal. With assistance from the Selenites, they free the Clair de Lune from the crater and fly the ship back to Earth.

In the year 1997, the Baron, Sirius, and their friends are still alive thanks to their talismans. Surrounded by skyscrapers and flying vehicles, the Baron and Sirius reminisce about their adventures.

Voice Cast

References

Sources

External links
 

1984 films
1984 animated films
1980s science fiction comedy films
1980s French animated films
French science fiction comedy films
Baron Munchausen
Films about astronauts
Films about extraterrestrial life
Films about immortality
Films based on German novels
Films directed by Jean Image
Films set in the 18th century
Films set in the 20th century
French animated films
1980s French-language films
Fiction about invasions
Moon in film
1984 comedy films
Films scored by Shuki Levy
Films scored by Haim Saban